The International Journal of Environmental Research and Public Health is a peer-reviewed open access scientific journal published by MDPI. The editor-in-chief is Paul B. Tchounwou. According to the Journal Citation Reports 2020 edition, the journal has a 2020 impact factor of 3.390, ranking 118/274 in 'Environmental Sciences'; 68/203 in 'Public, Environmental & Occupational Health'.

Abstracting and indexing
The journal is abstracted and indexed in:

References

External links 
 

English-language journals
Environmental health journals
Human impact on the environment
MDPI academic journals
Monthly journals
Open access journals
Public health journals
Publications established in 2004